Tennis at the 2014 Asian Games was held at the Yeorumul Tennis Courts, in Incheon, South Korea from 20 September to 30 September 2014.

A total of 153 tennis players from 24 nations competed in tennis at the 2014 Asian Games, Chinese Taipei finished first at the medal table by winning five medals.

Schedule

Medalists

Medal table

Participating nations
A total of 153 athletes from 24 nations competed in tennis at the 2014 Asian Games:

See also
 Tennis at the Asian Games

References
Number of Entries by NOC

External links 
 

 
2014 Asian Games events
Asian Games
2014
2014 Asian Games